Oddicombe Beach is a popular beach, noted for its interesting breccia cliffs, below the Babbacombe district of Torbay, Devon in England.

The beach includes many facilities which include a cafe, beach hut and deck chair hire, a beach shop, trampolines, motor boat hire, pedalo hire and kayak hire.

See also
Babbacombe Cliff Railway

Torbay
Beaches of Devon